Ají dulce, ají cachucha, quechucha, ajicito, or ají gustoso is any of a variety of sweet perennial peppers found in Latin America and the Caribbean. It is most widely known in Cuba, Jamaica, Puerto Rico, Dominican Republic and Venezuela, where it refers to a specific native variety of Capsicum chinense that is related to the habanero but with a much milder, smoky flavor. In the English-speaking Caribbean, it is known as seasoning pepper and is essential to a variety of traditional dishes.

Meanings of names
In South American Spanish ají means 'chili pepper' and dulce means 'sweet', so the name translates to 'sweet chili pepper'. Cachucha is a Latin American word for 'cap', so ají cachucha means 'cap chili pepper' and refers to its cap-like shape. Gustoso means 'tasty', so ají gustoso translates to 'tasty chili pepper'. Ajicito is the diminutive of ají and translates to 'little chili pepper'.

Use in cooking
In Venezuelan cuisine, ají dulce is a key ingredient in many traditional dishes, like the national dish pabellón criollo. The Venezuelan ají dulce is classified as non pungent, between 100 and 500 in the Scoville scale.

In the Dominican Republic it is known as "aji gustoso". In Cuba, it is known as ají Cachucha. 

In Puerto Rico where it is called ají dulce or ajicito, it is grown commercially and used for sauces, such as recaíto, sofrito, and mojito isleño, other fish or meat sauces, as well as stews, rice, and other local dishes.

See also
Ají pepper, a spicier pepper
List of Capsicum cultivars

References

 Weaver, William Woys. (2000) 100 Vegetables and Where They Came From. Chapel Hill, NC: Algonquin Books. 

 

Chili peppers
Puerto_Rican_cuisine
Venezuelan culture
Capsicum cultivars